Obrazów  is a village in Sandomierz County, Świętokrzyskie Voivodeship, in south-central Poland. It is the seat of the gmina (administrative district) called Gmina Obrazów.

References

Villages in Sandomierz County
Radom Governorate
Kielce Voivodeship (1919–1939)